The Indian Ocean raid, also known as Operation C or Battle of Ceylon in Japanese, was a naval sortie carried out by the Imperial Japanese Navy (IJN) from 31 March to 10 April 1942. Japanese aircraft carriers under Admiral Chūichi Nagumo struck Allied shipping and naval bases around Ceylon, but failed to locate and destroy the bulk of the British Eastern Fleet. The Eastern Fleet, commanded by Admiral Sir James Somerville, was forewarned by intelligence and sailed from its bases prior to the raid; its attempt to attack the Japanese was frustrated by poor tactical intelligence.

Following the attack the British expected a major Japanese offensive in the Indian Ocean. The main base of the Eastern Fleet relocated to East Africa, and Ceylon was reinforced, but Somerville kept his fast carrier division, Force A, "...in Indian waters, to be ready to deal with any attempt by the enemy to command those waters with light forces only." However, the Japanese had no short-term plans to follow up on their success, and within the year operations in the Pacific made it impossible to do so.

Background

Strategic situation
The island of Ceylon was strategically important, since it commanded the Indian Ocean. Thus it controlled access to India, the vital Allied shipping routes to the Middle East and the oilfields of the Persian Gulf. Ceylon held most of the British Empire's resources of rubber. An important harbour and naval base, Trincomalee, was located on the island’s eastern coast. Japanese propaganda had an effect on some of the Sinhalese population, who now awaited their arrival.

The fall of Singapore on 15 February 1942 broke the United Kingdom's eastern defensive perimeter of the Bay of Bengal; and Japanese occupation of the Andaman Islands on 23 March 1942 gave Japan control of the Andaman Sea enabling ships to resupply Japanese troops in the Burma Campaign for control of India. Both German and British authorities anticipated Japanese capture of Ceylon to solidify control of the Bay of Bengal and disrupt British resupply for defence of India, Australia, and perhaps the Middle East.

Japanese intentions to mount a major offensive into the Indian Ocean were placed on hold in March 1942; strong naval forces were needed in the western Pacific against the United States, and the Imperial Japanese Army (IJA) refused to allocate troops for an invasion of Ceylon. In response, the IJN developed Operation C, a plan for an aggressive raid into the Indian Ocean in early April. Operation C aimed to destroy the British Eastern Fleet, and disrupt British lines of communications in the Bay of Bengal in support of the Burma Campaign.

British intelligence correctly assessed the Japanese strategy. The Americans were notified; the Doolittle Raid – which was already in progress – took on the additional role of a diversion.

Japanese preparations
Admiral Isoroku Yamamoto issued the initial order to proceed with Operation C to the IJN's southern force, commanded by Admiral Nobutake Kondō, on 9 March 1942. By 16 March, the plan was to depart from Staring Bay, Celebes, on 26 March for an attack on Colombo ("C day") on 5 April. The Japanese expected to destroy the British Eastern Fleet in port.

The carriers were accompanied by all four s, and both s.

Japanese intelligence on the composition of the British Eastern Fleet in the Indian Ocean was reasonably accurate, 
while overestimating the air strength on Ceylon. The 19 March operational order vaguely advised that a "considerable" portion of British naval and air forces in the Indian Ocean were "deployed in Ceylon area".

The Japanese stationed reconnaissance submarines outside of the known British anchorages at Colombo and Trincomalee; their effectiveness was limited. At least one submarine was sent to scout the Maldive Islands but failed to detect Port T at Addu Atoll.

At the same time as Operation C, the IJN also dispatched Malay Force, consisting of the aircraft carrier , six cruisers, and four destroyers to destroy shipping in the Bay of Bengal on 1 April. Malay Force was not part of Operation C.

British preparations
The reinforcement of the British Eastern Fleet depended on transfers from Britain and the Mediterranean, a reflection of active warzones and the demands on the Royal Navy's (RN) resources.

In late-December 1941, a reassessment of the threat posed by Japan envisioned transferring the majority of the RN's heavy units to the Eastern Fleet. Matters were made urgent by the crippling of the United States Pacific Fleet's battle line at Pearl Harbor, which exposed the weak forces in Malaya to attack. Heavy units were freed up by American reinforcements in the Atlantic. The construction programs of the late-1930s were also starting to yield new heavy units. The Mediterranean yielded far fewer reinforcements than expected due to serious losses in that theatre in 1941.

The Eastern Fleet that Vice Admiral Sir James Somerville assumed command of in March 1942 was smaller than what had been envisioned in December 1941. Somerville divided the fleet into two groups, based on speed. The slower "Force B" was formed around the old carrier  and four unmodernized s. A few submarines were also available. The ships had never operated together before, and both ship and air crews were deficient in training.

Allied intelligence accurately assessed the strength of the Japanese force. Somerville planned to evade the Japanese during the day and close to launch torpedo strikes with radar-equipped Fairey Albacore bombers during the night. However, the plan was based on information provided by the Far East Combined Bureau (FECB), which identified only two carriers in the Japanese force. FECB also believed the Japanese would sail from Staring Bay on 21 March for a "C day" of 1 April. Thus, Somerville sailed early expecting to fight a smaller and manageable enemy force, particularly in aircraft strength. As such, Somerville likely did not see his plan as incompatible with his orders from the Admiralty, which were to protect the lines of communications in the Indian Ocean, and to maintain the Eastern Fleet as a fleet in being by avoiding unnecessary risks.

The British recognized the threat of Japanese carrier-borne air attack on Ceylon after strike on Pearl Harbor, and the island's air defences were reinforced. On 7 December 1941, air defences consisted of four obsolescent three-inch anti-aircraft guns - at Trincomalee - with neither fighters nor radar. By 4 April, there were 67 Hawker Hurricanes and 44 Fairey Fulmar fighters, a radar station each at Colombo and Trincomalee, and 144 anti-aircraft guns; 37 or 38 Hurricanes were serviceable around Colombo on 5 April. The fighters were divided into three Royal Air Force (RAF) squadrons of Hawker Hurricanes (two at Colombo, and one at Trincomalee), and two squadrons of RN Fleet Air Arm (FAA) Fairey Fulmars. In the same time frame, other air forces increased from eight obsolete torpedo bombers, to seven Consolidated PBY Catalina flying boats, 14 Bristol Blenheim IV bombers, and 12 Fairey Swordfish torpedo bombers. On the eve of battle, RAF forces were part of 222 Group, commanded by Air Vice-Marshal John D'Albiac.

Raid

First moves

The Japanese sailed from Staring Bay on 26 March as planned.

Ceylon air defences and forces went on alert, with land-based aerial reconnaissance concentrating on the southeast, where the Japanese were expected to approach to launch strikes at Colombo and Trincomalee. Air defences stood down, although Catalina patrols continued.

The Catalina transmitted the sighting, but not the size of the fleet, before being shot down. At this time, Somerville was refuelling at Port T; Force A sailed eastward toward the Japanese upon receiving the sighting; Force B could not be ready until 5 April. Catalina FV-R from 205 Squadron RAF took off at 17:45 to shadow the Japanese fleet, making its first report at 22:37 on 4 April, and a final report at 06:15 on 5 April while  from Ceylon. FV-R was shot down about 90 minutes after the final report.

Within an hour of QL-A's report, D’Albiac met with his subordinates to discuss an anticipated Japanese strike after dawn. 222 Group issued a warning to subordinate units before midnight, and units went on alert at 04:00 on 5 April. On the morning of 5 April, six Swordfish from 788 Naval Air Squadron (788 NAS) began relocating from China Bay, near Trincomalee, to Colombo, in preparation for a strike on the Japanese fleet. Admiral Geoffrey Layton, on Ceylon, ordered ships put to sea to avoid being attacked in harbour. Cornwall and Dorsetshire, which had just reached Colombo, were sent to rejoin Force A; they sailed late on 4 April. Hermes sailed from Trincomalee and was ordered to hide northeast of Ceylon.

The Japanese did not perform an aerial reconnaissance sweep along their intended course on the afternoon of 4 April, and a planned reconnaissance of Colombo harbour by cruiser floatplanes was cancelled. The Japanese realized surprise was lost after intercepting a signal from Colombo asking QL-A to repeat its report.

Attack on Colombo

Japanese intelligence on the morning of 5 April 1942 indicated that British carriers were absent, and the Japanese morning air search was limited accordingly. A reconnaissance Fulmar launched from Force A at 08:00 spotted one of the Japanese aircraft at the extreme edge of the south-west search area at 08:55 about  ahead of Force A.

Shortly after 06:00 Nagumo's force began launching 91 bombers and 36 fighters for the strike on Colombo. British early warning failed to detect and identify the incoming strike, forcing British pilots to scramble under fire when the first Japanese aircraft appeared over them at 07:45. The effective defence of the Ratmalana airbase by British fighters left the harbour exposed. The armed merchant cruiser , the Norwegian tanker Soli and the old destroyer  were sunk; three other ships were damaged. The port was damaged but was not put out of action. 20 of the 41 British fighters that took off were destroyed. At least one fighter was damaged and made incapable of flight while attempting to take off. The six Swordfish of 788 NAS arrived during the battle and were shot down. The Japanese lost seven aircraft.

Nagumo changed course to west-southwest at 08:30 – unknowingly causing the opposing fleets to steam toward one another – and recovered the Colombo strike from 09:45 to 10:30.

The size of the airstrike on Colombo was Somerville's first concrete evidence that the Japanese force contained more than the two carriers he expected. Nonetheless he continued to steam toward the enemy at 18 knots. Radar-based fighter direction would allow Force A to avoid surprise attack by neutralizing shadowing Japanese aircraft.

Loss of Dorsetshire and Cornwall

At 10:00, an aircraft from Tone searching the southwest area spotted and began shadowing Dorsetshire's force; the aircraft reported that the cruiser was heading southwest and making 24 knots. The cruisers reported the shadower, but had no means to drive it off. Nagumo increased speed from 24 to 28 knots upon receiving the sighting. Carrier Division 5's reserve strike force was ordered rearmed with anti-ship torpedoes, replacing the high explosive bombs intended for a second strike on Colombo. The rearming encountered delays, and the strike was carried out by Carrier Division 2 instead; Soryu and Hiryu began launching dive bombers at 11:45. Force A radar detected the air strike on Dorsetshire's force at 13:44, putting the aircraft  to the northeast. Cornwall and Dorsetshire were sunk at 1400; ultimately 424 officers and crew were lost.

The Japanese missed an opportunity to find Force A after sinking the cruisers. The aircraft shadowing the cruisers flew another  along the cruisers' course before returning to Tone. It would have detected Force A if it had flown southwest another ten minutes.

Nagumo recovered the strike against the cruisers at 14:45.

Nagumo evades Somerville
Nagumo's southeasterly course would have taken the Japanese fleet right through the centre of the arc. However, at 15:00 or 15:30, Nagumo changed course to the southwest. Carrier Division 2 did not immediately follow; it performed a series of kinking manoeuvres starting at 15:00 that initially took it northwest. Carrier Division 2 was spotted by the two northerly Albacores around 16:00. Hiryū launched Mitsubishi A6M Zero fighters to intercept the scouts; one Albacore was damaged at 16:04, and the other shot down at 16:28 without reporting. The two southernmost Albacores missed Nagumo's main body.

At 17:00 he received signals intelligence (SIGINT) from Colombo reporting the Japanese course at 14:00 as southwesterly at 24 knots.

The damaged Albacore landed at 17:45, less than a half-hour before sunset, and the crew was debriefed. There were two resulting revisions to the 16:00 sighting, which were transmitted to Somerville at 18:00 and 18:17 respectively, and differed significantly from the other and the original report. The final revision correctly identified the two carriers of Carrier Division 2 – which Somerville likely realized to be only part of the enemy force – but also claimed they were heading toward the northwest at a position  or the original sighting. The course heading conflicted with the first revision, which suggested a course toward the southeast. Late on 5 April, FECB decrypted a JN 25B message containing Nagumo's planned movement on 6 April, but this did not aid Somerville as the transmission to the fleet was garbled. Somerville declined to launch a strike based on poor information, and opted to head northwest in pursuit. Later, aircraft were sent to search the easterly arc. By this time it was too late to reestablish contact with the Japanese.

For the Japanese, too, there was a lost opportunity to find the British before night fell. Nagumo did not order a search for the British carriers at the appearance of British carrier-based aircraft. Search aircraft might require homing signals from the carriers to return, homing signals which the enemy could use to locate the Japanese. The Japanese continued southeast at 20 knots completely unaware of the presence of Force A. Carrier Division 2 rejoined the main body's track at 18:00, and caught up at 22:00  due east of Force A. The Japanese circled wide to the south and then east in preparation for striking Trincomalee. The Japanese suspected the presence of British carriers, and on the morning of 6 April they launched a much denser westward air search, but found nothing. Further searches on route to Trincomalee were equally unsuccessful as the British carriers were by that time far to the west.

By 6 April, British SIGINT indicated the Japanese force contained four carriers and three battleships, a force Somerville clearly realized as beyond the Eastern Fleet's capability to engage without undue risk. The declining serviceability of his fighter force also reinforced his caution. Even so, Somerville did not immediately withdraw or return to port. Force B rejoined early on 6 April. In the afternoon 1,122 survivors from Dorsetshire's force were recovered, while maintaining a look-out for the superior enemy force with all-around air reconnaissance. Intelligence from Ceylon put the Japanese between Port T and Ceylon. Somerville cautiously arrived at Port T from the west at 11:00 on 8 April and refuelled.

Attack on Trincomalee
By 8 April, the Eastern Fleet had withdrawn and the Japanese fleet was approaching Trincomalee from the east. The Japanese fleet was detected by a RAF Catalina at 15:17 on 8 April. The harbour at Trincomalee was cleared that night.

The Japanese air search on the morning of 9 April was limited as on 5 April, as British carriers were no longer expected. 

The defending fighters - 17 Hurricanes and six Fulmars - took off in time, and inflicted the first kills of the battle when a section of Hurricanes attacked three Zeroes and shot down two. The China Bay airbase and the port were heavily bombed. The monitor  was damaged. SS Sagaing, a merchant ship carrying aircraft and ammunition, was set on fire and abandoned. Eight Hurricanes and a Fulmar were lost, although no serviceable fighters were lost on the ground. The Japanese lost four aircraft.

At 07:16 another Catalina from 413 Squadron RCAF spotted the Japanese fleet, but was shot down while reporting.

Blenheims attack the Japanese carriers
Around 10:25, nine unescorted Blenheims from 11 Squadron RAF attacked Nagumo's force. They were not detected inbound by the combat air patrol (CAP). Hiryū spotted the aircraft but failed to relay a warning to the other ships. As a result, the attack achieved total surprise. Four bombers were shot down over the carriers by CAP A6M2 Zeroes (two of which were claimed by Kaname Harada), and another by Japanese aircraft returning from the strike on Hermes. In return, a Zero was shot down near the carriers and another in the returning strike. This was the first time a Japanese carrier force had faced a concerted air attack.

Loss of Hermes

At 09:00 they reversed course. Shortly after the end of the attack on Trincomalee, an aircraft from Haruna spotted the ships. 80 Aichi D3A "Val" bombers, held in reserve on the Japanese carriers, attacked starting at 10:35. Both were sunk before noon near Batticaloa. Hermes was lost with 307 men after being hit by over forty  bombs. Vampire was lost with 8 men. The nearby hospital ship Vita rescued 600 men.

The Japanese attack expanded to nearby ships. The corvette  was hit by aircraft from Soryu and sunk with 53 men. Also sunk were the naval auxiliary Athelstone, the  tanker British  Sergeant, and the cargo ship Norviken.

British land-based Fulmars arrived only after Hermes was sunk. Two Fulmars and four Vals were destroyed.

Nagumo disengaged after recovering the strike on Hermes.

Aftermath

British reaction
The Japanese inflicted disproportionate damage on the enemy. They damaged port facilities, sank one carrier and two cruisers, destroyed a third of enemy ground-based fighters and nearly all of the enemy ground-based strike aircraft. In addition, 23 merchant ships, totalling 112,312 tons, were sunk, including those by the separate Japanese Malay Force. In return, the Japanese lost only 18 aircraft, with damage to about 31 more. Conversely, they failed to destroy, or even locate, the main bulk of the British Eastern Fleet.

The British interpreted their position as precarious. Ceylon and the Eastern Fleet were required to safeguard the sea lines of communications through the Indian Ocean. The British expected the Japanese to continue threatening these lines. SIGINT suggested that the Japanese were preparing a deliberate advance across the Indian Ocean. The raid demonstrated that the RAF was too weak to defend Ceylon and the naval anchorages, and that the navy was ill-prepared to meet a Japanese carrier force.

The Eastern Fleet transferred its main base to Kilindini, Kenya, in East Africa, temporarily ceding the eastern Indian Ocean to the Japanese; from there it continued contesting control of the central Indian Ocean on better terms. Force A, including its two aircraft carriers, Indomitable and Formidable, retired to Bombay, and Somerville regularly deployed a fast carrier force to the central Indian Ocean over the next six months, during which he operated from or near Ceylon for nearly half that time. On 18 April, naval planning accorded the Eastern Fleet the highest priority for reinforcement, which also included transferring most of the carriers from the Home Fleet and the Mediterranean, with the intention of returning to Ceylon in September.

By June, Ceylon was defended by three RAF squadrons (64 aircraft, plus reserves), three strike squadrons (including one of Beauforts), and much improved radar and anti-aircraft defences. Ground defences were manned by two Australian army brigades.

The invasion scare was short-lived. British intelligence detected the movement of the Japanese carrier force eastward in mid-April, and their deployment in the Pacific in mid-May. After the Battle of Midway in June, it was realized that there was no longer the threat of major Japanese naval activity in the Indian Ocean. In September, British intelligence predicted Japan would go over to the defensive. As a result, the Eastern Fleet was not reinforced as planned and, instead, shrank after early July.

Japanese reaction
The Japanese did not exploit their victory as the British feared. The decision to postpone major operations in the Indian Ocean was upheld. The Japanese aircraft carriers required maintenance and replenishment after months of intensive operations, and there was already difficulty in maintaining the strength of frontline air units. Nagumo and officers such as Mitsuo Fuchida (commanding Akagi's air group) felt that the losses inflicted on the British did not justify the loss of experienced Japanese air crews. Japanese attention also lay elsewhere. In early May, Japanese carriers fought the Battle of the Coral Sea in the southwest Pacific, followed in June by the Battle of Midway. In both cases, losses constrained Japanese options further.

In June, the IJA developed a plan for a major offensive in the Indian Ocean, including an invasion of Ceylon. The Germans were advancing in North Africa, which made an Axis link-up in the Middle East attractive. Resource constraints forced the IJN to reject it, especially once the Guadalcanal Campaign started.

Subsequently, the limit of Japanese operations in the Indian Ocean was against trade using submarines and armed merchant cruisers. Notably, a submarine group patrolling off East Africa attacked the harbour at Diego-Suarez, Madagascar, while the Allies were capturing the island. Ironically, the Allies were motivated by fears that the Japanese might establish a base there to attack trade. Overall, Japanese attacks on trade enjoyed some success, but after 1942 the presence of major Japanese naval units in the Indian Ocean virtually ceased.

Criticism of Nagumo
Nagumo's leadership has been characterized by Andrew Boyd as rigid and unimaginative, and contributed to the escape of the British Eastern Fleet. The manoeuvring of his fleet was mainly to facilitate strikes on Colombo and Trincomalee; the possibility that the enemy might be at sea was apparently not seriously considered. He failed to appreciate that the direction that Dorsetshire's force was sailing, and the later appearance of British carrier-based aircraft, were related. Furthermore, due to limited aerial reconnaissance, Nagumo had little concrete information of what was around him, especially to his front and exposed flanks. He was not served by the confidence that there was nothing else to be found outside of the few searches made.

The limited air searches conducted at the start of the battle reflected contemporary IJN practice, where the intensity of air searches was scaled according to expected threats. The stronger morning search on 6 April reflected the suspicion that British carriers might be present. The intensity of later air searches dropped off when the British carriers were not found and there was little expectation of encountering them. Ultimately, all navies suffered from inadequate air search planning during this period.

Problems with Japanese carrier operations
The raid also provided early examples of problems with Japanese carrier operations. Inadequate aerial reconnaissance failing to locate the enemy fleet in a timely fashion, the difficulty of rearming aircraft for a different mission at short notice, and the penetration of the CAP by enemy aircraft due to the lack of radar-directed fighter control, would all recur at the Battle of Midway.

Criticism of Somerville
Somerville's leadership was characterized by a willingness to take risks, bordering on recklessness.

The initial deployment of the fleet on 30 March endangered the British fleet in multiple ways. Somerville was relying on radar – manned by inexperienced personnel – to locate the enemy and facilitate night strikes. Much the same could have been expected had Somerville still been on station when the Japanese arrived – as they did – from the southwest. Somerville's decision to refuel at Port T – rather than on Ceylon – on 2 April allowed the Eastern Fleet to avoid Nagumo a few days later, and likely saved the Eastern Fleet from destruction.

The failure of the Japanese fleet to appear on 1–2 April led Somerville to mistakenly believe that the entirety, rather than a part, of Allied intelligence concerning Operation C was flawed. As a result he detached Cornwall, Dorsetshire, and Hermes, which were subsequently lost after being sent into areas overflown by Japanese aerial reconnaissance.

Andrew Boyd notes:

The disquieted Admiralty broadly agreed.

Somerville faced challenges not experienced by the RN in the Atlantic or Mediterranean. Japanese air superiority made it difficult to scout, close, and attack during the day. Radar-enabled night attack was the only viable offensive option. This was a high-risk strategy. A combination of careful positioning, luck, and Japanese errors nearly produced the preconditions for a strike on the night of 5 April; the enemy was within  – 1-hour flight range in an Albacore – but accurate information on the enemy's vector was missing. Even then, it required experienced air crews to find their targets at night, using radar with a range of just  and new tactics.

References

Notes

Articles

Books

  Uses recently translated Japanese sources.

Further Reading

	

Crusz, Noel, The Cocos Islands Mutiny, Fremantle: Fremantle Arts Centre Press, 2001.

External links

Order of battle
WW2DB.com: Raids into Indian Ocean
Royal Air Force History: Battle for Ceylon

Conflicts in 1942
Indian Ocean operations of World War II
Military of British Ceylon
Naval battles of World War II involving Japan
1942 in Japan
World War II raids
Naval battles of World War II involving Canada
Military history of Ceylon in World War II
Naval battles and operations of World War II involving the United Kingdom
March 1942 events
April 1942 events